This is a bibliography of American science fiction author Kim Stanley Robinson.

Works

Series

Three Californias

 The Wild Shore (1984)
 The Gold Coast (1988)
 Pacific Edge (1990)

The Mars trilogy

 Red Mars (1992) - Colonization
 Green Mars (1993) - Terraforming
 Blue Mars (1996) - Long-term results
 The Martians (1999) - Short stories

Science in the Capital series
 Forty Signs of Rain (2004)
 Fifty Degrees Below (2005)
 Sixty Days and Counting (2007)
Green Earth (2015) • collected and condensed omnibus edition

Novels
 Icehenge (1984)
 The Memory of Whiteness (1985)
 A Short, Sharp Shock (1990) (short novel)
 Antarctica (1997)
 The Years of Rice and Salt (2002)
 Galileo's Dream (2009)
 2312 (2012)
 Shaman: A Novel of the Ice Age (2013)
 Aurora (2015)
 New York 2140 (2017)
 Red Moon (2018)
The Ministry for the Future (October 2020)

Short story collections
 Orbit 18 (1976) (In Pierson's Orchestra, Coming Back to Dixieland)
 The Planet on the Table (1986)
 Venice Drowned (Universe 11, 1981)
 Mercurial (Universe 15, 1985)
 Ridge Running (F&SF 1984)
 The Disguise (Orbit 19, 1977) Originally published in Orbit 19, 1977, ed. Damon Knight, .
 The Lucky Strike (Universe 14, 1984) Originally published in Universe 14, 1984, ed. Terry Carr, . (nominated for Hugo Award for Best Novelette, Nebula Award for Best Novelette) (frequently anthologized, as in Alternative Histories, 1986, ed. Charles G. Waugh, Martin H. Greenberg, There Won't Be War, 1991, ed. Harry Harrison, Bruce McAllister)
 Coming Back to Dixieland (Orbit 18, 1976)
 Stone Eggs (Universe 13, 1983) Originally published in Universe 13, ed. Terry Carr, .
 Black Air (F&SF 1983)
 Escape from Kathmandu (1989)
 "Escape from Kathmandu" Originally published in Isaac Asimov's Science Fiction Magazine, September 1986. (nominated for Hugo Award for Best Novella, Nebula Award for Best Novella) (subsequently anthologized)
 "Mother Goddess Of The World" Originally published in Isaac Asimov's Science Fiction Magazine, October 1987. (nominated for Hugo Award for Best Novella) (subsequently anthologized)
 "The True Nature of Shangri-La" Appeared in Asimov's Science Fiction, December 1989.
 "The Kingdom Underground"
 Remaking History (1991)
 "A History of the Twentieth Century, with Illustrations" (in: Vinland the Dream) Originally published in Isaac Asimov's Science Fiction Magazine, April 1991, revised for Remaking History. (subsequently anthologized: The Year's Best Science Fiction: Ninth Annual Collection, 1992, ed. Gardner Dozois, ; Best New SF 6, 1992, ed. Gardner Dozois, ; The Giant Book of Fantastic SF, 1995, ed. Gardner Dozois, ; The Savage Humanists, 2008, ed. Fiona Kelleghan, .)* Down and Out in the Year 2000 (1992)
 "Before I Wake" (in Remaking History) Originally published in Interzone #27, 1989; Isaac Asimov's Science Fiction Magazine, April 1990) (nominated for Nebula Award for Best Short Story)
 "Glacier" (in Remaking History) Originally published in Isaac Asimov's Science Fiction Magazine, September 1988. (subsequently anthologized)
 "Remaking History" (in Remaking History and Vinland the Dream) Originally published in Other Edens II, 1988, ed. Robert Holdstock, Christopher Evans, ; then Isaac Asimov's Science Fiction Magazine, March 1989; and What Might Have Been? Volume 1: Alternate Empires, edited by Gregory Benford and Martin H. Greenberg, 1989, . (nominated for Hugo Award for Best Short Story but withdrawn as ineligible)
 "The Part of Us That Loves" (in Remaking History) Originally published in Full Spectrum 2, 1989, ed. Lou Aronica, Shawna McCarthy, Amy Stout, Pat LoBrutto, .
 "The Return from Rainbow Bridge" (in Remaking History) Originally published in The Magazine of Fantasy and Science Fiction, August 1987.
 "The Translator" (in Remaking History) Originally published in Universe 1, 1990, ed. Robert Silverberg, Karen Haber, .
 "Vinland the Dream" (in Remaking History, later in Vinland the Dream) Originally published in Asimov's Science Fiction, November 1991. (nominated for the Nebula Award for Best Short Story) (frequently anthologized)
 "Zürich" (in Remaking History) Originally appeared in The Magazine of Fantasy and Science Fiction, March 1990.
 Vinland the Dream (2001) 
 "A Sensitive Dependence on Initial Conditions" (in Vinland the Dream) Originally published in Author's Choice Monthly #20, Pulphouse Publishing, May 1991.
 "Black Air" (in Vinland the Dream) Originally published in The Magazine of Fantasy and Science Fiction, March 1983. (won 1984 World Fantasy Award, 1984 Science Fiction Chronicle Award; nominated for Nebula Award for Best Novelette) (subsequently anthologized)
 "Coming Back to Dixieland" (in Vinland the Dream) Originally published in Orbit 18, 1976.
 "Mercurial" (in Vinland the Dream) Originally published in Universe 15, 1985, ed. Terry Carr, . Later in Future Crimes, 2003, ed. Jack Dann, Gardner Dozois, .
 "Muir on Shasta" (in Vinland the Dream) Originally published in A Sensitive Dependence on Initial Conditions, Author's Choice Monthly #20, Pulphouse Publishing, 1991.
 "Ridge Running" (in Vinland the Dream) Originally published in The Magazine of Fantasy and Science Fiction, January 1984. (nominated for Hugo Award for Best Short Story)
 "Venice Drowned" (in Vinland the Dream) Originally published in Universe 11, 1981, ed. Terry Carr, . (nominated for the Nebula Award for Best Short Story)
 The Best of Kim Stanley Robinson (2010)
 "The Timpanist of the Berlin Philharmonic, 1942" (in The Best of Kim Stanley Robinson)

Short stories
 "A Martian Childhood" - Asimov's Science Fiction, February 1994.
 "A Transect" - The Magazine of Fantasy & Science Fiction, May 1986. (anthologized: Future Earths: Under African Skies, 1993, ed. Gardner Dozois, Mike Resnick)
 "Down and Out in the Year 2000" - Originally published in Isaac Asimov's Science Fiction Magazine, April 1986. (subsequently anthologized)
 "Festival Night" (from Red Mars) In: Nebula Awards 29, 1995, ed. Pamela Sargent, .
 "From 2312 (excerpt)" - Lightspeed Magazine, May 2012.
 "How Science Saved the World" - Nature, 6 January 2000. Also published under the title: "Review: Science in the Third Millennium", which appeared in Envisioning the Future: Science Fiction and the Next Millennium, 2003, ed. Marleen S. Barr, . This is a facetious review of two fictional books.
 "In Pierson's Orchestra" - Orbit 18, 1976, ed. Damon Knight, .
 "Me in a Mirror" - Foundation – The International Review of Science Fiction, #38 Winter 1986/87, 1987, ed. Edward James.
 "On the North Pole of Pluto" - After some reworking, this novella became the third part of Icehenge; also in Orbit 21, 1980, ed. Damon Knight, .
 "Our Town" - Originally published in Omni, November 1986; later in Lightspeed Magazine, April 2012.
 "Primate in Forest" - Future Washington, 2005, ed. Ernest Lilley, . Excerpt from Chapter One of Fifty Degrees Below.
 "Prometheus Unbound, At Last" - Nature, 11 August 2005.
 "Red Mars" - Interzone, #63 September 1992.
 "Sacred Space" - I'm With the Bears, 2011, ed. Mark Martin, . This excerpt is from chapter 6 of the novel Sixty Days and Counting.
 "The Blind Geometer" - Originally published as a limited edition by Cheap Street Press in 1986, then Isaac Asimov's Science Fiction Magazine, August 1987. (subsequently anthologized, as in The Mammoth Book of Modern Science Fiction: Short Novels of the 1980s, 1993, ed. Martin H. Greenberg, Isaac Asimov, Charles G. Waugh) (won the 1988 Nebula Award for Best Novella; nominated for the 1988 Hugo Award for Best Novella)
 "The Lunatics" - Originally published in Terry's Universe, 1988, ed. Beth Meacham, . (frequently anthologized)
 "The Memorial" - In the Field of Fire, 1987, ed. Jack Dann, Jeanne Van Buren Dann, .
 "The Thing Itself" - Clarion SF, 1977, ed. Kate Wilhelm, .
 "To Leave a Mark" - The Magazine of Fantasy and Science Fiction, November 1982. (nominated for the Hugo Award for Best Novella) Later incorporated as the first part of Icehenge
 "Green Mars" (in The Martians) Originally published in Isaac Asimov's Science Fiction Magazine, September 1985. (nominated for Hugo Award for Best Novella, Nebula Award for Best Novella) (subsequently anthologized)

Non-fiction
 
Future Primitive: The New Ecotopias (1994) Edited and wrote introduction of the anthology.
Green Planets: Ecology and Science Fiction (Wesleyan University Press) with Marquette University professor Gerry Canavan. Co-edited collection of scholarly essays on the relationship between ecological science, environmentalist politics, and science fiction.
State of the World 2013: Is Sustainability Still Possible? published by WorldWatch Institute (2013). Wrote chapter "is it too late?"
The High Sierra: A love story. (2022).

As editor 
 Nebula Awards Showcase 2002 (2002)
 In the Sierra: Mountain Writing by Kenneth Rexroth (2012),

About Robinson

References

Bibliographies by writer
Bibliographies of American writers
Science fiction bibliographies